Andrew Hazeldine (born 13 July 1994) is a cricketer. He holds dual British and New Zealand citizenship. He made his Twenty20 debut for Canterbury in the 2017–18 Super Smash on 17 December 2017. He made his first-class debut for Canterbury in the 2017–18 Plunket Shield season on 1 March 2018. In June 2018, he was awarded a contract with Canterbury for the 2018–19 season. He made his List A debut for Canterbury in the 2018–19 Ford Trophy on 31 October 2018.

In June 2020, he was offered a contract by Canterbury ahead of the 2020–21 domestic cricket season. However, in September 2020, Hazeldine was diagnosed Hodgkin's Lymphoma, ruling him out of the season.

References

External links
 

1994 births
Living people
English cricketers
New Zealand cricketers
Cricketers from Portsmouth
Canterbury cricketers